1299 Mertona is a bright background asteroid from the central region of the asteroid belt. It was discovered on 18 January 1934, by French astronomer Guy Reiss at Algiers Observatory, Algeria, in northern Africa. It was named after English astronomer Gerald Merton.

Orbit and classification 

Mertona is a non-family asteroid of the main belt's background population when applying the hierarchical clustering method to its proper orbital elements. It orbits the Sun in the central main-belt at a distance of 2.3–3.3 AU once every 4 years and 8 months (1,713 days). Its orbit has an eccentricity of 0.19 and an inclination of 8° with respect to the ecliptic. As neither precoveries nor prior identifications were obtained, Mertonas observation arc begins with its official discovery observation at Algiers.

Naming 

This minor planet was named after English astronomer Gerald Merton (1893–1983), who was president of the British Astronomical Association between 1950 and 1952. The  was mentioned in The Names of the Minor Planets by Paul Herget in 1955.

Physical characteristics

Rotation period 

Several rotational lightcurves of Mertona were obtained during 2003–2016. Photometric observations were taken by astronomers Andy Monson and Steven Kipp ( hours; Δ0.55 mag) in November 2003, by French amateur astronomer René Roy ( hours; Δ0.46 mag) in March 2005, by astronomers at the Palomar Transient Factory ( hours, Δ0.48 mag) in August 2012, and by Daniel Klinglesmith ( hours, Δ0.59 mag) at Etscorn Observatory  in Socorro, New Mexico. In addition, a 2016-published lightcurve, modelling data from the Lowell photometric database, gave a concurring period of  hours and a spin axis of (73.0°, 35.0°) in ecliptic coordinates.

Diameter and albedo 

According to the surveys carried out by the Japanese Akari satellite and NASA's Wide-field Infrared Survey Explorer with its subsequent NEOWISE mission, Mertona measures between 14.14 and 14.90 kilometers in diameter, and its surface has an albedo between 0.219 and 0.243. Although such a high albedo is typical for stony asteroids, the Collaborative Asteroid Lightcurve Link assumes an albedo of 0.057, which it uses as the generic albedo for all carbonaceous C-type asteroids. It therefore calculates a larger diameter of 27.90 kilometers (as the lower the albedo or reflectivity, the larger a body's diameter at an unchanged absolute magnitude or brightness). Carbonaceous asteroids are the predominant type in the outer main-belt, while stony asteroids are mostly found in the inner regions of the asteroid belt.

References

External links 
 Lightcurve Database Query (LCDB), at www.minorplanet.info
 Dictionary of Minor Planet Names, Google books
 Asteroids and comets rotation curves, CdR – Geneva Observatory, Raoul Behrend
 Discovery Circumstances: Numbered Minor Planets (1)-(5000) – Minor Planet Center
 
 

001299
Discoveries by Guy Reiss
Named minor planets
19340118